Catocala mirifica is a moth in the family Erebidae first described by Arthur Gardiner Butler in 1877. It is found in Japan.

References

mirifica
Moths described in 1877
Moths of Japan
Taxa named by Arthur Gardiner Butler